Western Schools is a company based in Ormond Beach, Florida, USA, that provides continuing education programs to health care professionals. The company was founded in 1979 and was a division of Specialty Commerce Corp. until August, 2018, when it was bought by Colibri Group.

Western Schools currently offers home study continuing education for the following health care professions: Nursing, Dentistry, Dental Hygiene, Dental Assisting, Occupational Therapy, Physical Therapy, Respiratory Care Therapy, Social Work, Marriage and Family Therapy, Counseling, Psychology,  Pharmacy, Speech-Language Pathology, Dietetics.

Nursing
Western Schools is accredited as a provider of continuing nursing education by the American Nurses Credentialing Center's (ANCC) Commission on Accreditation

Dentistry
Western Schools is an ADA CERP Recognized Provider. ADA CERP is a service of the American Dental Association to assist dental professionals in identifying quality providers of continuing dental education.

Social work

Western Schools, provider # 1147, is approved as a provider for social work continuing education by the Association of Social Work Boards (ASWB), through the Approved Continuing Education (ACE) program.

Counselors
Western Schools has been approved by NBCC as an Approved Continuing Education Provider, ACEP No. 6257.

References

External links
 Western Schools Homepage

Companies based in Massachusetts